Peyton Bryce Thompson (born September 26, 1990) is a former American football safety. He played college football at San Jose State University and attended Granite Bay High School in Granite Bay, California. He has been a member of the Atlanta Falcons, Washington Redskins, Chicago Bears and Jacksonville Jaguars.

College career
Thompson played for the San Jose State Spartans from 2008 to 2011, recording 186 total tackles and seven interceptions.

Professional career

Atlanta Falcons
Thompson signed with the Atlanta Falcons on May 2, 2012 after going undrafted in the 2012 NFL Draft. He was released by the Falcons on August 31 and signed to the team's practice squad on September 2, 2012. He was released by the Falcons on August 30, 2013.

Washington Redskins
Thompson was signed to the Washington Redskins' practice squad on November 27, 2013. He was released by the Redskins on August 9, 2014.

Chicago Bears
Thompson signed with the Chicago Bears on August 18, 2014 and was released by the Bears on August 23, 2014.

Jacksonville Jaguars
Thompson was signed to the Jacksonville Jaguars' practice squad on September 1, 2014. He was added to the team's active roster on October 25, 2014. He made his NFL debut on November 2, 2014 against the Cincinnati Bengals. Thompson was released by the Jaguars on November 11, 2014. He was signed to Jacksonville's practice squad on November 13, 2014. He was released by the Jaguars on September 4, 2015 and signed to the team's practice squad on September 6, 2015.

References

External links
San Jose State bio
NFL Draft Scout
College stats

1990 births
Living people
People from Granite Bay, California
Sportspeople from Greater Sacramento
Players of American football from California
American football defensive backs
African-American players of American football
San Jose State Spartans football players
Jacksonville Jaguars players
21st-century African-American sportspeople